Edward Craddock Ratcliff (16 December 1896 – 30 July 1967) was an English Anglican priest and liturgical scholar. He was Professor of Liturgical Theology at King's College, London (1945–1947), and Ely Professor of Divinity (1947–1958) and Regius Professor of Divinity (1958–1964) at the University of Cambridge.

Works 
The English Coronation Service (1936)
The Book of Common Prayer: Its Making and Revisions (1949)
The Coronation Service of Queen Elizabeth II (1953)
From Uniformity to Unity (1962)

See also 
 Book of Common Prayer
 Christian liturgy

References 

Obituary, The Times, July 4, 1967.
Edward Craddock Ratcliff: A Bibliography of His Published Works (Alcuin Club, 1967)

1896 births
1967 deaths
Alumni of St John's College, Cambridge
Regius Professors of Divinity (University of Cambridge)
Anglican liturgists
20th-century English male writers
Ely Professors of Divinity